Charles Henry "Chuck" Cook (28 July 1926 – 23 February 1993) was a broadcaster and politician in Canada.

Cook was born in Regina, Saskatchewan. He became a CJOR radio talk show host in Vancouver, British Columbia in the 1970s. He served as Progressive Conservative Member of Parliament from 1979 to 1988 in the riding of North Vancouver—Burnaby and from 1988 to 1993, in the riding of North Vancouver. He also ran for the Progressive Conservative Party of Alberta in the riding of Calgary Centre in the 1967 election but came up a very close second to Frederick C. Colborne of the Alberta Social Credit Party.

He died of cancer before finishing his term as member in the 34th Canadian Parliament.

External links
 
 BC Radio History: Chuck Cook bio, accessed 29 October 2006

1926 births
1993 deaths
Progressive Conservative Association of Alberta candidates in Alberta provincial elections
Canadian columnists
Canadian radio hosts
Members of the House of Commons of Canada from British Columbia
Progressive Conservative Party of Canada MPs
Politicians from Regina, Saskatchewan
Politicians from Vancouver